Eternity (stylized as ETERN!TY) is a South Korean virtual idol group formed by Pulse9. The group debuted on March 22, 2021, with the single "I'm Real". The group consists of 11 members: Seoa, Sujin, Minji, Zae-in, Hyejin, Dain, Chorong, Jiwoo, Yeoreum, Sarang and Yejin. They are created with artificial intelligence technology, Deep Real.

History
On March 22, 2021, Eternity released their debut single "I'm Real", sung by Hyejin, Seoa, Yeoreum, Sujin and Minji.

On August 25 and 26, Pulse9 released the teasers of sixth member, Dain's solo debut single "No Filter", and released the song on August 27.

Members
Yeoreum (여름) - leader, vocalist
Minji (민지) - rapper, dancer
Hyejin (혜진) - rapper
Seoa (서아)
Sujin (수진) - vocalist
Dain (다인)
Chorong (초롱)
Zae-In (제인) - rapper
Jiwoo (지우)
Sarang (사랑)
Yejin (예진)

Discography

Singles

See also 

 Aespa

References

External links 
Eternity Official Website (Korean)
Julie Yoonnyung Lee and Amelia Hemphill, K-pop: the rise of the virtual girl bands, BBC News, 12 December 2022

2021 establishments in South Korea
K-pop music groups
Musical groups established in 2021
South Korean girl groups
Artificial intelligence art